Lucas Browne (born 14 April 1979) is an Australian professional boxer and former mixed martial artist and kickboxer. He held the WBA (Regular) heavyweight title in 2016 when he stopped Ruslan Chagaev. At regional level, he has held multiple heavyweight championships, including the Australian and Commonwealth heavyweight titles between 2012 and 2015.

Professional boxing career

Early career 
Browne turned professional on 20 March 2009 at the age of 30. He won his first contest by fourth round knockout. On 17 February 2012, Browne became the Australian heavyweight champion by knocking out Colin Wilson in three rounds.

On 28 April 2013, he defeated the future hall of famer and three-weight division world champion James Toney by twelve round unanimous decision with scores of 117–111, 119–109, and 120–108. Three months later, he stopped former NABF heavyweight champion Travis Walker in seven rounds. Walker dropped Browne in round 1. Although Walker appeared to clearly win round 7, his corner called the fight off before round 8 could get underway.

In November 2013, Browne scored a fifth round TKO of former European Union heavyweight champion Richard Towers. The fight was an eliminator for the Commonwealth heavyweight title, which at the time was held by David Price.

Regional success 
On 26 April 2014, Browne fought Éric Martel-Bahoéli for the vacant Commonwealth heavyweight title at the Ponds Forge Arena in Sheffield, England. Browne knocked down Martel-Bahoéli in round 2 but the fight continued. In round 3, following an accidental clash of heads, Browne was cut over the left eye. Two inspections were undertaken by the ringside doctor, who allowed the fight continue. Martel-Bahoéli was knocked down again in round 4 and the end came in round 5 when Browne connected with a right uppercut. Browne also claimed the WBC Eurasian Pacific Boxing Council heavyweight title.

Browne vs. Rudenko 
Browne defended the WBC-EPBC title on 1 August 2014 against Andriy Rudenko (24-0) at the Civic Hall in Wolverhampton, England. Browne defeated Rudenko by a 12 round unanimous decision to win the vacant WBA Inter-Continental heavyweight title. The judges scored the fight 116–112, 115–113, and 117–112 all in favour of Browne.

WBA (Regular) heavyweight champion

Browne vs. Chagaev 
On 14 November 2015, the WBA ordered Ruslan Chagaev to reach a deal to make a defence of his WBA title against Australian heavyweight contender Browne. The two sides had until 30 November to reach a deal. Chagaev's promoter Timur Dugazaev announced the fight would likely take place in Grozny in March 2016. In the January 2016, the fight was officially announced to take place on 5 March. Browne won the fight by stopping Chagaev in the tenth round. Browne landed nearly 20 unanswered punches, mostly right hands, before referee Stanley Christodoulou stopped the fight at 2 minutes, 27 seconds. Browne was knocked down in the sixth round and at the time of the knockout, behind on all judges scorecards, 81–88, 82–88, and 82–88. The fight was not without controversy, with a reported 59 seconds of erroneous time during rounds 6 and 7 of the bout.

Drug issues 
Browne was later stripped of the title due to a failed drug test for the banned substance clenbuterol. Browne repeatedly maintained his innocence, however testing on the second sample for the drug proved positive.

On 2 November 2016, the WBA ordered Browne to fight American heavyweight veteran Shannon Briggs for the WBA regular title. The fight was ordered to take place before the end of 2016. Browne was originally due to fight Fres Oquendo, who hadn't fought since 2014, however that fight could not be made due to Oquendo recovering from an injury. The WBA ordered the winner of this bout to fight Oquendo in a mandatory defense within 120 days.

Reports indicated that after 8 months of being stripped of the WBA heavyweight title due to positive A and B samples for the banned substance clenbuterol, Browne has produced another positive drug test, this time for the banned substance ostarine.

On 18 May 2017, Browne's manager, Matt Clark announced that he would be making a return to the ring on 2 June 2017 at the Club Punchbowl in Sydney. On 26 May, his opponent was announced as journeyman Mathew Greer (16-20, 13 KOs). In a scheduled six round fight, Browne dropped and stopped the over matched Greer in round 2. After the win, Browne set his sights on WBO heavyweight champion Joseph Parker.

Post-title career

Browne vs. Whyte 
On 17 October 2017, it was reported that Browne would travel to Moscow, Russia, to fight unbeaten 30-year-old Sergei Kuzmin (11-0, 8 KOs) for the WBA Inter-Continental title on 27 November. Kuzmin, known for his amateur background where he beat the likes of Joe Joyce, Robert Cammarelle and Ivan Dychko. Browne backed out of the fight and was replaced by American boxer Amir Mansour. On 7 November, it was reported that Browne had signed a deal to challenge undefeated WBO heavyweight champion Joseph Parker. Locations discussed were Parker's home city of Auckland or Melbourne in Australia. Browne's promoter Matt Clark stated that Browne had signed the contract and was now waiting on Parker to sign the deal. At the time, Browne was not listed in the WBO's top 15 rankings, meaning he would need to fight for a WBO regional title to get ranked. On 11 January 2018, the fight between Browne and WBC Silver heavyweight champion Dillian Whyte was finally made, to take place at the O2 Arena in London on 24 March. In order to win Whyte's WBC Silver title, Browne vowed to get into immense physical condition, joining the weight loss challenge at F45 Kellyville Ridge, while also adding the burn machine to his strength and conditioning program.

Whyte hit Browne with a hard left hook to the head in round 6 to knock him down and out unconscious, winning the fight. There was no count made and the fight was waved off immediately with ringside doctors attending to Browne before giving him oxygen. The fight was officially stopped at 0:37 of the round. Browne's face was cut and badly swollen from the clean shots landed from Whyte. Browne left himself open most of the time and tried switching stances after a few rounds. Browne suffered a cut over his left eye in round 3, which got worse with each round. Whyte then bloodied Browne's nose in round 5. After the fight, Browne was stretchered to a nearby hospital for precaution and Whyte called out WBC champion Deontay Wilder for a fight in June 2018. Promoter Hearn said, "I hope the WBC make Dillian mandatory now, the fight is there for Deontay Wilder in June. We have to force the shot and after that performance, he deserves the shot." Hearn stated there could be a possibility that the WBC order a final eliminator between Whyte and Dominic Breazeale.

Back to winning ways 
Browne returned to the ring on 28 September 2018 at the Convention and Exhibition Centre in Gold Coast and knocked out 41-year-old Julius Long (18–20, 14 KOs) for a second time in three years. A right hand to the chin knocked out Long. After the fight, Browne called out Dave Allen and Adam Kownacki. He was also called out by David Price in October.

Browne returned two months later on 24 November against journeyman Junior Pati at the Saint Johns Netball Centre in Auckland, New Zealand. The fight marked Browne's first time fighting in the country as a professional. Browne controlled the fight, eventually knocking Pati out in round 5 with a left hook followed by a right uppercut. Referee Lance Revill waved off the fight. Browne also claimed the vacant WBC Asian Boxing Council silver title. After the fight, Browne published a short video on his Instagram account crediting his return to F45 at Kellyville Ridge and the addition of an intense swimming pool preparation as being the key contributors to his immense physical condition.

Browne vs. Sokolowski 
On 2 March, 2019, Browne fought Kamil Sokolowski. Browne won the six round bout on points.

Browne vs. Allen 
In his next fight, Browne faced David Allen. The first two rounds didn't provide too much action, but in the third round Allen caught Browne with a vicious body shot and knocked him down. Browne was not able to recover and Allen was awarded the KO victory in the third round.

Browne vs. Gallen 
On 21 April, 2021, Browne went up against Paul Gallen and lost via first round technical knockout.

Personal life
Browne has three children. Before becoming a professional boxer and mixed martial artist he was a nightclub bouncer in Kings Cross and a professional rugby league footballer for the Parramatta Eels under-18s in the S. G. Ball Cup. Browne also made it to the top 50 of Australian Idol 2004.

Professional boxing record

Mixed martial arts record

|-
| Loss
| align=center| 6–2
| Jim York
| TKO (punches)
| XMMA: Xtreme MMA 3
|  
| align=center| 2
| align=center| 1:52
| Sydney
| 
|-
| Win
| align=center| 6–1
| Sam Brown
| KO (punches)
| Shamrock Events: Kings of Kombat 1
|  
| align=center| 3
| align=center| 3:16
| Melbourne
|
|-
| Loss
| align=center| 5–1
| Daniel Cormier
| TKO (punches)
| XMMA 2: ANZ vs. USA
|  
| align=center| 1
| align=center| 4:35
| Sydney
| 
|-
| Win
| align=center| 5–0
| Leamy Tato
| TKO (punches)
| XMMA 1: Xtreme MMA
|  
| align=center| 2
| align=center| 2:42
| Sydney
|Won the XMMA Heavyweight Championship.
|-
| Win
| align=center| 4–0
| Willie Moon
| TKO (punches)
| CFC: Cage Fighting Championships 11
|  
| align=center| 1
| align=center| N/A
| Sydney
| 
|-
| Win
| align=center| 3–0
| Felise Leniu
| KO (punches)
| CFC 10: Light heavyweight Grand Prix Finals
| 
| align=center| 2
| align=center| 1:14
| Sydney
| 
|-
| Win
| align=center| 2–0
| Tui Wright
| TKO (doctor stoppage)
| CFC 8: Light heavyweight Grand Prix
| 
| align=center| 1
| align=center| 0:23
| Sydney
| 
|-
| Win
| align=center| 1–0
| Jeff King
| TKO (punches)
| CFC 7: Battle at the Big Top
| 
| align=center| 2
| align=center| 1:47
| Sydney
|

Mixed martial arts titles
Xtreme MMA
XMMA Heavyweight Championship (One time)

See also

List of heavyweight boxing champions
List of mixed martial artists with professional boxing records

References

External links

Lucas Browne - Profile, News Archive & Current Rankings at Box.Live

1979 births
Living people
Australian Idol participants
Security guards
Sportsmen from New South Wales
Boxers from Sydney
Heavyweight mixed martial artists
Mixed martial artists utilizing boxing
Australian male mixed martial artists
Australian male boxers
Commonwealth Boxing Council champions
Doping cases in boxing
Australian sportspeople in doping cases
World Boxing Association champions
World heavyweight boxing champions